Baurtregaum at , is the 13th–highest peak in Ireland on the Arderin scale, and the 18th–highest peak on the Vandeleur-Lynam scale.  Baurtregaum is situated at the centre of the massif of the Slieve Mish Mountains in the Dingle Peninsula in Kerry, Ireland, and is the tallest mountain of the Slieve Mish range, with a number of major subsidiary summits.

Naming 
According to Irish academic Paul Tempan, the "three hollows" in the Irish name are probably the valleys of Derrymore (north), Derryquay (north-east) and Curraheen (east), which cut into the sides of the mountain.

Geography 
Baurtregaum is the highest mountain of the Slieve Mish range, which is situated on the eastern end of the Dingle Peninsula, in Kerry.  It is connected by a western ridge to the 2nd-highest peak in the range, Caherconree .  Baurtregaum has several subsidiary peaks including, Baurtregaum NW Top , Baurtregaum NE Top  (with northern spur  Scragg), and Baurtregaum Far NE Top .
  
The most notable of Baurtgreaum's "three hollows" is the northerly Derrymore Glen, through which the Derrymore River runs, and which contains three scenic lakes, bounded by the steep valley walls of Baurtregaum and Caherconree and the peak of Gerhane .  Also notable is the easterly Curraheen Glen, through which the Curraheen River runs, is bounded by the long easterly ridge from Baurtregaum to Baurtregaum Far NE Top.

Baurtregaum's prominence of  qualifies it as a Marilyn, and it also ranks it as the 6th-highest mountain in Ireland on the MountainViews Online Database, 100 Highest Irish Mountains, where the minimum prominence threshold is 100 metres.

Hill walking 

The popular route is the Derrymore Glen Horseshoe, a 11-kilometre 5-hour loop that starts from the base of the Derrymore Glen and ascends to the first summit of Gearhane , and then around the "horseshoe" to Caherconree and the summit of Baurtregaum.  Options for the descent use either the Baurtregaum NW Top spur or the Baurtregaum NE Top Spur (and the Scragg) to get back to the base of the Glen.  The route is recommended for its views of the Glen as well as incorporating most of the main peaks of the Slieve Mish range, and thus is also called The Slieve Mish Circuit in some guidebooks.

Gallery

Bibliography

See also

Lists of mountains in Ireland
List of mountains of the British Isles by height
List of P600 mountains in the British Isles
List of Marilyns in the British Isles
List of Hewitt mountains in England, Wales and Ireland

References

External links
MountainViews: The Irish Mountain Website, Baurtregaum 
MountainViews: Irish Online Mountain Database
The Database of British and Irish Hills , the largest database of British Isles mountains ("DoBIH")
Hill Bagging UK & Ireland, the searchable interface for the DoBIH

Mountains and hills of County Kerry
Marilyns of Ireland
Hewitts of Ireland
Mountains under 1000 metres